John Harvey Butchart (May 10, 1907 – May 29, 2002) was a mathematics professor who was well known for his hiking exploits in and around the Grand Canyon in Arizona, United States. Beginning in 1945, Butchart explored the Grand Canyon's backcountry on foot. He wrote extensively about his adventures and influenced generations of canyoneers.

Sparse human communities have lived, worked, and traveled in the harsh and beautiful Canyon terrain at least since the Ancestral Puebloans. Native Americans occupied parts of the canyon in the mid 1800s when American explorers first arrived, followed over time by prospectors, miners, researchers, and the outdoor tourists who now dominate the community. Most of the millions of visitors to Grand Canyon National Park remain in the developed South and North Rim areas. A smaller number hike into the Canyon along a few well-maintained trails. A very small number venture beyond, into the true wilderness of the Park. Harvey Butchart led the way, using extraordinary physical exertion and individual skill to travel where few others can.

Upon moving to Flagstaff in 1945, he began exploring the Grand Canyon. After hiking most of the main routes, he began to explore unofficial routes, old Native American trails, and even animal trails. His mentors included Merrel Clubb and Emery Kolb. He sometimes hiked alone but most often traveled with friends and students. That community of enthusiasts persists to the present, focused around the Backcountry Information Center. A 2007 biography tells his story and that of foot exploration in the Grand Canyon.

In contrast to his predecessors, Butchart kept a detailed log of his explorations, which would eventually reach  more than 1,000 pages. He recorded 1,024 days spent in the Canyon, and over  walked. He climbed 83 summits within the Canyon, and scaled the walls at 164 places, claiming 25 first ascents. He was credited with discovering over 100 rim-to-river routes within the Canyon.

By 1963 Butchart was the acknowledged expert on backcountry hiking. In multiple trips over several years, he had completed the very first route from one end of the national park to the other, except for about four miles below Great Thumb and Tahuta Points. 
Colin Fletcher relied heavily on Butchart's knowledge to plan his own hike through the whole park in a single journey later that year.
 Fletcher wrote:
 Today, Harvey Butchart is a compact, coiled-spring fifty-five – and a happy and devoted schizophrenic. Teaching mathematics is only one of his worlds. At intervals he lives in a quite different reality. His three-year-old grandson, a young man of perception, recently heard someone use the words “Grand Canyon.” “Where Grandpa lives?“ he asked, just to make sure.

Beginning in 1970, Butchart published three slim volumes of trail notes from his exploration records.

He continued hiking until 1987. In 1998, the books were republished in one volume with additional new material. Butchart's famously cryptic texts were written for those developing the strength and skill to hike safely in the most remote areas. They focus largely on routes to pass through the major cliff lines and to find water sources. For many of the routes, his texts are the only published references.

About 97% of the National Park area is defined as backcountry, which the Backcountry Information Center classifies into management zones as Corridor, Threshold, Primitive, and Wild.

Receiving a permit to camp in each zone requires increasing levels of experience, preparation, and consultation with the Center. The Center tracks trail and water-supply conditions from hiker reports and has water quality data for many springs.

Butchart was interviewed many times as his fame grew, for example in 1994.
He donated a large amount of material to Northern Arizona University.
 
The collection includes more than 1,000 pages of his original trail logs, 52 hiking maps with handwritten annotations, more than 7,000 color slide photographs, extensive correspondence, and related publications. The collection and guide were reorganized in 2020.

In 2009, the US Board on Geographic Names honored Harvey Butchart by naming a 7,600-foot butte within Grand Canyon National Park "Butchart Butte". The butte is east of the Walhalla Plateau in the eastern area of the national park. On the North Rim it can be seen from Pt. Imperial (7 miles southeast), or on the South Rim from Desert View (12 miles north-northwest). It is 1.5 miles west of Gunther Castle along the divide between Kwagunt and Chuar Valleys but not specifically mentioned in his route guides.

Family and academic career 

Butchart was born in Hefei, China, in Anhui Province to missionary parents.
After his father died, the family moved in 1920 to Vermont, Illinois, and later to Eureka, Illinois. Butchart graduated from Eureka College in 1928
and received a master's

and PhD
from the University of Illinois in 1929 and 1932, respectively. He married Roma Wilson in 1929, and they raised two children. He taught mathematics at several Midwest colleges. After three years at Grinnell College, the family moved to Flagstaff in 1945 to help cure their daughter's hay fever.

Butchart taught mathematics at Arizona State College (now known as Northern Arizona University) from 1945 until retiring in 1976. He was sponsor of the school's hiking club for 12 years and a chair of the Mathematics Department.

References

External links
 John Harvey Butchart photo

1907 births
2002 deaths
Eureka College alumni
Grand Canyon history
Northern Arizona University faculty
People from Flagstaff, Arizona
People from Illinois
University of Illinois Urbana-Champaign alumni